Evan McMullin, a candidate in the 2016 United States presidential election, received the endorsements of the following notable individuals.

U.S. state officials

State executive officials

 Greg Bell, former Lieutenant Governor of Utah
 Sam Reed, former Secretary of State of Washington

State legislators

Utah State Senators
 Lincoln Fillmore
 Howard A. Stephenson
 Daniel Thatcher

Utah State Representatives

 Jake Anderegg
 Fred Cox
 Paul Ray
 Justin Fawson

Local officials
 Stacy Beck, Spanish Fork, Utah councilwoman
 Richard Brunst, mayor of Orem, Utah
 Kim Jackson, County Treasurer of Utah County, Utah 
 Rick Moore, mayor of Payson, Utah
 Jon Pike, mayor of St. George, Utah 
 Aimee Winder Newton, Salt Lake County, Utah councilwoman

U.S. Congress
 Chris Cannon (R), former U.S. Representative from Utah's third congressional district
 Slade Gorton (R), former U.S. Senator from Washington
 Lindsey Graham (R), U.S. Senator from South Carolina
 Mike Lee (R), U.S. Senator from Utah
Jeff Flake (R), U.S. Senator from Arizona

International political figures
 Louise Mensch, former Conservative member of the British House of Commons and editor of Heat Street

Editors, columnists, writers and media personalities

 Audrey Assad, contemporary Christian music artist.
 Sho Baraka, Christian hip hop artist.
 Orson Scott Card, science fiction novelist
 Mona Charen, columnist, political analyst, and author
 Erick Erickson, The Resurgent, former editor-in-chief of RedState
 Jim Geraghty, National Review contributor
 Jonah Goldberg, National Review columnist
 Sharlene Wells Hawkes, Miss America 1985 and sports announcer
 William Kristol, political analyst and commentator, founder and editor of The Weekly Standard
 Meghan McCain, columnist, author, Fox News Channel host and contributor, and blogger.
 Jay Nordlinger, National Review senior editor
 William F. B. O'Reilly, conservative publisher 
 Avik Roy, Forbes opinion editor, policy advisor, political strategist, and investment analyst
 Charlie Sykes, radio talk show host
 J. D. Vance, author of Hillbilly Elegy

Activists
 Kahlil Byrd, founder of Stand Up America PAC
Natalie Gordon, co-chair of the Davis County, Utah, Republican Party

Political parties and organizations
 Better for America
 Florida Independent Party
 Independence Party of Minnesota
 Independence Party of South Carolina

Newspapers
 Daily Herald 
Charleston Gazette-Mail

Notes

McMullin, Evan
McMullin, Evan, 2016